Under the Midnight Sun may refer to

 Under the Midnight Sun (album), a studio album by the British rock band The Cult
 Under the Midnight Sun, a 1915 novel in the Corto Maltese series